The Ministry of Higher Education, Science and Technology is a ministry of the Government of South Sudan. The incumbent minister is Hon. Gabriel Changson,

List of Ministers of Higher Education, Science and Technology

See also
 Ministry of Education, Science and Technology (South Sudan)

References

Higher Education, Science and Technology
South Sudan, Higher Education, Science and Technology
South Sudan, Higher Education, Science and Technology